This is a list of airlines currently operating in Norway.

Scheduled Airlines

Charter airlines

See also
 List of airlines of Svalbard
 List of defunct airlines of Norway
 List of defunct airlines of Europe

References

Norway
Airlines
Airlines
Norway